Elissarrhena is a genus of flowering plants belonging to the family Menispermaceae.

Its native range is Southern Tropical America.

Species:

Elissarrhena grandifolia 
Elissarrhena solimoesana

References

Menispermaceae
Menispermaceae genera